Nocardioides deserti is a Gram-positive and aerobic bacterium from the genus Nocardioides which has been isolated from rhizosphere soil from the plant Alhagi sparsifolia in the Taklimakan desert in Xinjiang, China.

References

External links
Type strain of Nocardioides deserti at BacDive -  the Bacterial Diversity Metadatabase	

deserti
Bacteria described in 2015